Mbongolwane is a town in Uthungulu District Municipality in the KwaZulu-Natal province of South Africa.

Mbongolwane district hospital is located in this town.

References

Populated places in the uMlalazi Local Municipality